Giovanni Battista Zanchi (1515–1586) was an Italian engineer and author.

Life 
Born in Pesaro in 1515 in a family originary from Bergamo, he was a captain leading 12.000 infantrymen and 500 knights for the duke of Parma and Piacenza Ottavio Farnese during the fights against Protestants in Germany. He came back at home with honors, and served during the Siena war under Marcantonio Colonna. In 1561 he was called in Cyprus, where he served as engineer with a salary of 50 ducats a month.

Zanchi wrote some treatises documenting his studies and observations about defensive fortifications of the cities.

Works

References 
 Biographie universelle ancienne et moderne, París, 1843.
 Biographie universelle ancienne et moderne, París, L.G. Michaud, 1828.
 Miscellanea di storia italiana, Torino, 1874.
 The Penny cyclopaedia, London, 1843.
 Weiss, Charles, Biographie universelle ou ditionnaire historique, París, 1838.

1586 deaths
1515 births
16th-century Italian writers
16th-century male writers
16th-century Italian engineers
Italian military engineers
16th-century soldiers
Italian essayists
Male essayists
17th-century Italian male writers
Italian male non-fiction writers